Dickson Nickson Job (born 29 December 2000) is a Tanzanian professional footballer who plays as a centre-back for Tanzanian Premier League club Young Africans and the Tanzania national team.

Club career
Job began his senior career in the Tanzanian Premier League with Mtibwa Sugar. He transferred to Young Africans on 11 January 2021.

International career
Job made his senior debut with the Tanzania national team in a friendly 2–1 loss to Kenya on 15 March 2021.

References

External links
 
 

2000 births
Living people
Tanzanian footballers
Tanzania international footballers
Association football defenders
Mtibwa Sugar F.C. players
Young Africans S.C. players